Bellewstown is a village located 8 km south of Drogheda, on the Hill of Crockafotha in County Meath in Ireland.

It takes its name from the Anglo-Irish Bellew family, who were the dominant local landowners from the thirteenth to the seventeenth century.

Bellewstown village
Amenities in Bellewstown include a primary school, Catholic church, pub, GAA grounds, racecourse, and golf course.

Bellewstown Races

In 1780, George Tandy, a former mayor of Drogheda and brother of James Napper Tandy, persuaded King George III to sponsor a race at Bellewstown. The race was called His Majesty's Plate and was valued at £100.

The tradition of summer horse racing at Bellewstown Racecourse dates back centuries. The first record of racing here appears in the August edition of the Dublin Gazette and the Weekly Courier in 1726. There was originally a cricket ground in the middle of the race track. Racing continues to occur on an annual basis, taking place during the course of the summer. There are currently two meetings a year, comprising four days in July and two days in August. The track is a one-mile and one-furlong left-handed course, featuring both flat and hurdle racing.

Associations
One of the many pen names used by poet James Clarence Mangan was 'P.V. M'Guffin, Bellewstown'.

See also
 List of towns and villages in Ireland

References

Towns and villages in County Meath